Alcithoe grahami is a species of medium-sized deepwater sea snail, a gastropod mollusc in the family Volutidae, the volutes.

The shell height is up to 32.5 mm, and the shell width is up to 15 mm.

References

 Powell A W B, New Zealand Mollusca, William Collins Publishers Ltd, Auckland, New Zealand 1979 

Volutidae
Gastropods of New Zealand
Gastropods described in 1965
Taxa named by Arthur William Baden Powell
Endemic fauna of New Zealand
Endemic molluscs of New Zealand